My Mother's Smile is a 2002 Italian film directed by Marco Bellocchio. The original Italian title is L'ora di religione (Il sorriso di mia madre) ("The Hour of Religion (My Mother's Smile)").

Summary
The film tells the story of a man whose "martyred" mother is in the process of canonization. She had been killed by her insane son, Egidio, while she slept. However, since this death would not count as "martyrdom", and would not qualify her for sainthood, the family is claiming she had been awake, begging her son to stop blaspheming, and that she had forgiven him before she died. The story is told from the perspective of her son Ernesto, a well-known painter and an atheist. The film portrays a colorful fresco so hypocritical to Catholicism today, showing how hard it still creeps into our lives, even against our will (as the protagonist shows). He often remembers for the delivery of a blasphemy explicit narrative tension at maximum (for this reason in Italy it was rated not suitable for kids who are less than 14 years old).

Plot 
Ernesto Picciafuoco, painter and illustrator of children's tales, is a part of a very important but impoverished family, which wants to regain its stature by having a member canonized. ns. The late mother of the protagonist seems to be the only true religious person in the weak and stupid family. Two of the young rebels are now in the 40s and are completely detached from the hypocrisy of religion. One of them pretends to be very religious, to get back his job. The other, the protagonist, is uncertain, beset by moral doubts, mainly because of his young son who could learn the hypocrisy from him. 
The film is a journey through the absurd and surreal episodes. Ernesto, the protagonist, is contacted by a mysterious cardinal who wants to question him about the process of sanctification of the mother, about which he knew nothing until then. Then the child goes to school for the hearings with teachers, where he meets a young and charming, "religious teacher", to whom he is attracted, but that will be an impossibility. He has a discussion with a religious man appointed to investigate circumstances of "martyrdom", which asks account the non-baptism of his son, showing that he is well informed about him and trying to know why Ernest had "lost faith". Ernesto is then challenged to a duel, for petty reasons, from a noble dream of an improbable restoration of the monarchy, but the duel is interrupted after a few seconds. He talks with his aunt, who has never shown much faith, but now, attracted by possible financial gain and popularity that the family would derive from sanctification, for a purely opportunistic attempt to bring her nephew on the "right path". Meanwhile, the wife of Ernesto administers a sort of baptism to the child sleeping, anxious to repair the previous "non-". Ernesto's aunt smiles cravingly while awaiting to be seen by his Holiness, with their familial collaborators, all but Ernesto, who prefers to walk with his child to school.

Cast
 Sergio Castellitto - Ernesto Picciafuocco
 Jacqueline Lustig - Irene Picciafuocco
 Chiara Conti - Diana Sereni
 Gigio Alberti - Ettore Picciafuocco
 Alberto Mondini - Leonardo Picciafuocco
 Gianfelice Imparato - Erminio Picciafuocco
 Gianni Schicchi - Filippo Argenti (as Gianni Schicchi Gabrieli)
 Maurizio Donadoni - Cardinal Piumini
 Donato Placido - Egidio Picciafuocco
 Renzo Rossi - Baldracchi
 Pietro De Silva - Curzio Sandali
 Bruno Cariello - Don Pugni
 Piera Degli Esposti - Aunt Maria
 Toni Bertorelli - Count Ludovico Bulla
 Maria Luisa Bellocchio - Zia Ernesto

Awards 
 David di Donatello for Best Supporting Actress (Piera Degli Esposti)
 European Film Awards Best Actor (Sergio Castellitto)
 4 Nastro d'Argento
 Prize of the Ecumenical Jury - Special Mention at the 2002 Cannes Film Festival

References

External links 
 

2002 films
Films directed by Marco Bellocchio
2002 drama films
Italian drama films